Richard Tanner Pascale, born 1938, is an academic, management theorist and business advisor. He was based at Stanford Business School for 20 years and is currently (2020) an Associate Fellow of the Saïd Business School at the University of Oxford. The Economist magazine has named him "one of the leading management gurus of the past 50 years".

Pascale's management works include:
The Art of Japanese Management: Applications for American Executives (1981), co-authored with Anthony Athos of Harvard Business School.
Managing On the Edge: How Successful Companies Use Conflict to Stay Ahead (1990),
Surfing the Edge of Chaos: The Laws of Nature and the New Laws of Business (2000), co-authored with Mark Millemann and Linda Gioja,
The Power of Positive Deviance: How Unlikely Innovators Solve the World's Toughest Problems (2010), co-authored with Jerry Sternin and Monica Sternin.

In Managing on the Edge (1990), Pascale noted that "few of the top 500 companies in the US 10 years ago" (i.e. 1980) were still leading companies and looked for explanations for why companies decline. Pascale has catalogued management fads (or business fads), enumerating 37 different new management ideas which emerged between 1950 and 2000.

Several of these texts are co-authored. In The Power of Positive Deviance, Pascale took the lead in writing up observations and reflections based on the work of his co-authors Jerry and Monique Sternin, fieldworkers and Positive Deviance practitioners who had undertaken Peace Corps child development work in Vietnam, observed by Pascale. The work of the Sternins was also observed in Bangladesh, Indonesia, Myanmar, Uganda, Argentina and the Pittsburgh VA Hospital and incorporated into the book.

He earned his MBA at Harvard Business School.

References

American management consultants
Stanford University Graduate School of Business faculty
Harvard Business School alumni